Julida is an order of millipedes. Eyes may be present or absent, and in mature males of many species, the first pair of legs is modified into hook-like structures. Additionally, both pairs of legs on the 7th body segment of males are modified into gonopods.

Distribution
Julida contains predominantly temperate species ranging from North America to Panama, Europe, Asia north of the Himalayas, Asir region, Saudi Arabia, and Southeast Asia.

Classification
The order Julida contains approximately 750 species, divided into the following superfamilies and families:

Blaniuloidea C. L. Koch, 1847
Blaniulidae C. L. Koch, 1847
Galliobatidae Brolemann, 1921
Okeanobatidae Verhoeff, 1942
Zosteractinidae Loomis, 1943
Juloidea Leach, 1814
Julidae Leach, 1814
Rhopaloiulidae Attems, 1926
Trichoblaniulidae Verhoeff, 1911
Trichonemasomatidae Enghoff, 1991
Nemasomatoidea Bollman, 1893
Chelojulidae Enghoff, 1991
Nemasomatidae Bollman, 1893
Pseudonemasomatidae Enghoff, 1991
Telsonemasomatidae Enghoff, 1991
Paeromopodoidea Cook, 1895
Aprosphylosomatidae Hoffman, 1961
Paeromopodidae Cook, 1895
Parajuloidea Bollman, 1893
Mongoliulidae Pocock, 1903
Parajulidae Bollman, 1893

References

Ilic, B. (2019). Multifaceted activity of millipede secretions:. [online] Web of Science. Available at: http://apps.webofknowledge.com/full_record.do?product=WOS&search_mode=GeneralSearch&qid=1&SID=6AJXsNVdjIGRrwQybhF&page=1&doc=4 [Accessed 18 Oct. 2019].

External links

 
Millipede orders